Fixed position assembly refers to an assembly system or situation in which the product does not move while being assembled, this configuration is usually contrasted in operations management and industrial engineering with assembly lines. Dimensioning this system is very simple: considering CP as productive capacity and T as average assembly time, then N, number of working stations, is given by N=CP*T.

Advantages

high system flexibility: both in introducing new products and attaining product customization
high variability in operations naturally lends itself to introducing job enlargement (to the benefit of the worker)
low investment: only "capital" needed are generic worker tools.

Disadvantages

High work in progress
Significant space occupancy
Higher labor costs: workers need to know how to perform all operations of the technological cycle and therefore skilled labor needs to be employed (this is in sharp contrast to the assembly line in which a worker needs almost no training thanks to division of labour being carried to its extreme.

See also

Production systems

Further reading
A. Portioli, A. Pozzetti, Progettazione dei sistemi produttivi, Hoepli 2003

External links
 Boeing being assembled

Industrial processes